Kasba Lake Water Aerodrome  is located on Kasba Lake, Northwest Territories, Canada and is open from June until October.

References

Registered aerodromes in the North Slave Region
Seaplane bases in the Northwest Territories